Kurt Wendlandt (August 13, 1917 in Poznań – February 13, 1998 in Berlin) was a German painter, printmaker, photographer, author and illustrator. His work incorporates paintings, drawings, statuary, photogram, Décollage, light graphics and photos. Books illustrated by Wendlandt have been published in (Germany), the United Kingdom, the Netherlands, Austria, Sweden, Switzerland and the GDR.

Exhibitions (selection) 
1942–44: Große Deutsche Kunstausstellung Haus der Kunst, Munich
1961: Retrospektive Rathaus Spandau, Berlin
1965: A 65 Amsterdam-Berlin-Frankfurt Haus des Deutschen Kunsthandwerks, Frankfurt am Main, Germany
1968: Vom fototechnischen Experiment zur Neuen Figuration Galerie Clarissa, Hannover
1968: Foto-Grafik, Sammlung Clarissa Museum August Kestner, Hanover
1968: Sühnezeichen Aarhus, Copenhagen, Denmark
1969: Lichtgrafik Haus am Lützowplatz, Berlin
1969: Foto 69 Rhodes National Gallery, Salisbury (today: National Gallery of Zimbabwe), Harare, Zimbabwe
1970: Artes gráficas aplicadas à fotografia de Kurt Wendlandt Goethe-Institut, Sao Paulo und Rio de Janeiro, Brasil
1972: Zyklus OSSIAN Lottehaus, Wetzlar, Germany
1973: Akzente und Kontraste Kunstforum Ostdeutsche Galerie, Regensburg, Germany
1976: Lichtgrafik Goethe-Institut, Paris, France
1976: La VII Bienal de Ibiza Museo de Arte Contemporaneo, Ibiza, Spain
1977: Retrospektive Forum bildender Künstler, Essen
1977: Die Medien der bildenden Kunst Neue Nationalgalerie (National Gallery), Berlin
1980: Kunst in Berlin 1930–1960 Berlinische Galerie (State Museum of Berlin for Modern Art and Photography), Berlin
1985: Galerie des Lichts Berlin, Berlin
1988: Retrospektive Spandau Citadel, Berlin
1988: Neue Sammlungen Berlinische Galerie (State Museum of Berlin for Modern Art and Photography), Berlin
1989: Photographie als Photographie Berlinische Galerie, Berlin
1990: Abwesenheit. Fotogramme und die Kunst des 20. Jahrhunderts Kunsthaus Zürich, Zurich, Switzerland
1991: Interferenzen: Kunst aus Westberlin: 1960 – 1990 Latvian National Museum of Art, Riga, Latvia
1998: Lichtseiten Berlinische Galerie (State Museum of Berlin for Modern Art and Photography), Berlin, Germany
2010: Fotografische Verfahren Kunstmuseum Moritzburg (State Museum of Sachsen-Anhalt), Halle, Germany
2016: NATURE MORTE, Museum of Contemporary Art of Crete, Crete, Greece
2017: Transparenz und Reflexion – 100 Jahre Kurt Wendlandt, Galerie Eirmos, Thessaloniki, Greece
2019: Isola d' Ischia GALLERY 1/1, San Jose, USA 
2020: Material Inquiries Johanna Breede PHOTOKUNST, Berlin as part of the European Month of Photography

Publications 
As Author (selection)
Elisa (together with Elfi Wendlandt), Herold, 1960
Fumo, der Rauchgeist (together with Elfi Wendlandt), Parabel Verlag, 1962
Die drei Königreiche, Sellier, 1971.
Beiträge zu Integralen Weltsicht. Vol. VI., Internationale Jean Gebser Gesellschaft, Schaffhausen (Hrsg.) Willi Schlichter Atelier, 1986.
Die 'Ent – Rüstung' der Athene. Die Entfaltung des menschheitlichen Bewußtseins, Druckerei Fuhl & Hornung, 1999

As Illustratrator (Selection)
Grimms Märchen, Brothers Grimm/Otto Hohenstatt, Schweizer Volks – Buchgemeinde, 1950
Sidelights on Modern America, Helene Voigt und Helene Kirchhoff, Cornelsen Verlag, 1952
Die Lederstrumpf-Erzählungen, Karl May, Droemer Verlag, 1954
Die versunkene Insel, Noble Edward und Heinrich Hecke, Ueberreuter, 1954
Der Fliegende Pfeil, Fritz Steuben, Kosmos (publisher), 1955
Kommodore Hornblower auf allen Meeren, C. S. Forester, Verlag Carl Ueberreuter, 1956
Märchen, Otto Hohenstatt, Union Deutsche Verlagsgesellschaft, 1959
Ano lebt in der Tundra, Anna Dobrinskaja, Parabel Verlag, 1962
Ben Ali und seine Herde, Karl Friedrich Kohlenberg, Union Deutsche Verlagsgesellschaft, 1963
Märchen aus Tausendundeine Nacht, Walter Bauer, Union Deutsche Verlagsgesellschaft, 1963
David in der heiligen Nacht, Urs Markus, Obpacher Verlag, München, 1964
Die Nachtigall, Hans Christian Andersen, Broschek Verlag, Hamburg, 1969
Der Kaiser und der Kleine Mann, Rudolf Otto Wiemer, Steinkopf, 1972

Further reading 
Stoffe werden transparent gemacht (Ausstellung Kurt Wendlandt) In: Die Welt June 11, 1964
A.B.: Fotokunst auf neuen Wegen, In: Berliner Morgenpost September 3, 1969
Das Unbewußte sichtbar machen (Wendlandt gestaltet Phantastisches) In: Kölner Stadtanzeiger June 16, 1972
Who's who in the Arts, WHO'S WHO-BOOK & PUBLISHING GmbH, Ottobrunn, 1975
Berliner Künstler im Gespräch Band 2, Dieter Biewald, Verlag A.F. Koska, Wien / Berlin, 1975
M.K.: Die Einheit in der Vielfalt (Forum präsentiert "Transperenz und Reflexion" von Kurt Wendlandt) In: Westdeutsche Allgemeine Zeitung March 15, 1977
Horst Hartmann: Mystiker des Lichts (Der Berliner Kurt Wendlandt mit Lichtgrafik in Mannheim) In: Badische Neueste Nachrichten June 10, 1977
Studia Mystica Volume VI, Number 3, Fall 1983, California State University
Interferenzen: Kunst aus Westberlin 1960–1990, Nishen-Verlag, 1991
Das Fotogramm in der Kunst des 20. Jahrhunderts, Floris M. Neusüss & Renate Heyne, DuMont Buchverlag, Köln, 1990
Encyclopedia of Twentieth-Century Photography, Volume 1, Lynne Warren, Routledge, 2005
Concrete Photography. Konkrete Fotografie, Gottfried Jäger, Rolf H. Krauss, Beate Reese, Kerber, Bielefeld 2005, .

References

External links 
Profile on Art.net
Profile on Artfacts.net
Profile on concrete-photography.org
Biography on kurtwendlandt.com

20th-century German painters
20th-century German male artists
German male painters
German illustrators
20th-century illustrators of fairy tales
1917 births
1998 deaths
20th-century German printmakers